The 1936 King's Birthday Honours in New Zealand, celebrating the official birthday of King Edward VIII, were appointments made by the King on the advice of the New Zealand government to various orders and honours to reward and highlight good works by New Zealanders. They were announced on 23 June 1936.

The recipients of honours are displayed here as they were styled before their new honour.

Knight Bachelor
 Dr James Sands Elliott   – of Wellington. For public services.
 The Honourable John Ranken Reed  – senior judge of the Supreme Court, and acting chief justice.

Order of Saint Michael and Saint George

Companion (CMG)
 Carl August Berendsen  – permanent head of the Prime Minister's Department and secretary for External Affairs, Wellington.
 Daniel Vickery Bryant – of Te Rapa. For social-welfare and philanthropic services.

Order of the British Empire

Commander (CBE)
Civil division
 Jean Gardner Batten. For general services to aviation.

References

Birthday Honours
1936 awards
1936 in New Zealand
New Zealand awards